William R. Carey is a Canadian curler and curling coach.

Awards
Manitoba Curling Hall of Fame: 2014 (with all 1979 Canadian Men's Championship Team skipped by Barry Fry)

Teams

Men's

Mixed

Personal life
Bill Carey is from a known Canadian family of curlers: his brother Dan is curler and coach, and 1992 Canadian men's champion; Dan's daughter Chelsea is two-time Canadian women's champion.

Record as a coach of national teams

References

External links
 
 Bill Carey Gallery | The Trading Card Database
 William Carey - Curling Canada Stats Archive

Living people
Canadian male curlers
Brier champions
Canadian curling coaches
Curlers from Winnipeg
Year of birth missing (living people)